Sanja Vuksanović (born 4 March 1967) is a Serbian chess player. She earned the FIDE title of Woman Grandmaster (WGM) in 1998. She won FR Yugoslavia Women's Chess Championship in 1992. In July 1998, she reached FIDE Top 50 Women ranking list.

Biography
In the 1990s, Vuksanović was one of the leading female chess players in Serbia. In 1991, she shared first place in Women's World Chess Championship Zonal Tournament and won the right to take part in an Interzonal Tournament. In 1991, Vuksanović participated in Women's World Chess Championship Interzonal Tournament in Subotica where she was tied 16th-21st. In 1992, she won FR Yugoslavia Women's Chess Championship.

Sanja Vuksanović played for FR Yugoslavia in the Women's Chess Olympiads:
 In 1996, at third board in the 32nd Chess Olympiad (women) in Yerevan (+4, =0, -4),
 In 1998, at first reserve board in the 33rd Chess Olympiad (women) in Elista (+1, =1, -2).

In 1992, she was awarded the FIDE Woman International Master (WIM) title and received the FIDE Woman Grandmaster (WGM) title in 1998.

In July 1998, she reached FIDE Top 50 Women list when she was ranked tied 50th−53rd (51st on additional criteria).

References

External links
 
 
 
 
 

1967 births
Living people
Serbian female chess players
Yugoslav female chess players
Chess woman grandmasters
Chess Olympiad competitors